The Kings Mountain Herald is a weekly newspaper based in Kings Mountain, North Carolina. It was established in 1886 by William Andrew Mauney.

References

Weekly newspapers published in North Carolina
Mass media in Charlotte, North Carolina